Oliver Jarvis (born 9 January 1984) is a British professional racing driver currently racing in the FIA World Endurance Championship, European Le Mans Series and Asian Le Mans Series.

Jarvis won the 2022 IMSA Championship (including the 2022 24 Hours of Daytona) in the DPi category with Meyer Shank Racing.

Early life

Born in Burwell, Cambridgeshire, he was educated at The King's School, Ely.

Early career

Jarvis was first introduced to motorsport from an early age when his father Carl was competing in Formula Ford 1600. Keen to try it for himself, and at just six years old, Jarvis enjoyed his first motorcross competition, albeit then two wheels not four.

At the age of eight, Jarvis made the transition to race karts. During his 10 years in karts, he achieved notable success in British and European events, as well as in World Karting as one of Tony Kart's Works driver.

Jarvis moved from European Karting when he was 18 to the highly competitive British single seater car championships racing in the Formula Ford category for two successful seasons before moving up to Formula Renault.

2005 proved to be an outstanding year of achievements for Jarvis when he became the 2005 Formula Renault UK Champion having gained 5 wins, 7 podiums, 4 pole positions and 3 ELF /Atol Driver of the Day Awards. He was also awarded BRDC Rising Star status.

Jarvis's perfect end to the year was receiving the prestigious McLaren Autosport Young Driver of The Year Award that December, presented to him by Formula One legend Sir Stirling Moss.

2006 saw Jarvis move up to the British F3 International Series, racing for the famous Carlin Motorsport team, run by Trevor Carlin. Jarvis was an instant success, and won two races, beating Bruno Senna (nephew of the late Ayrton) to 2nd in the standings. He went on to dominate the end of season Macau F3 Grand Prix in 2007, leading every lap and looking unchallenged throughout to take the biggest victory of his career.

Jarvis was added to the roster for A1 Team Great Britain in A1 Grand Prix, and may get a chance to race often in 2006-07 season, should he impress more than Darren Manning and Robbie Kerr, or should the two be unavailable for any reason.

Jarvis did get his first chance at the Beijing International Streetcircuit in China, the third race weekend of the season. Through a problematic weekend, where problems with the track arose, Jarvis started the Sprint race in 8th, and finished in 7th in a race that saw little racing, following 7th-starting South Africa spinning, bringing out the Safety Car for a majority of the race. In the Feature race, Jarvis therefore started 7th. After controversially making his mandatory pitstop on the lap the Safety Car was deployed (A1GP rules state that cars cannot pit during Safety Car periods), Jarvis ended up running 8th for a majority of the race, an 8th that was actually a net 4th, given the cars in the first four places were yet to pit. After they did, Jarvis moved up to fourth, and looked to be heading for that position, until the leading duo, The Netherlands driver Jeroen Bleekemolen and Germany's Nico Hülkenberg both retired on the same lap, leaving Jarvis to finish second, behind Italy's Enrico Toccacelo.

Jarvis' next outing was at the Mexico round. This time Jarvis went one better, winning the Feature race for Great Britain's first ever A1 Grand Prix victory.

DTM career 
In 2008, Jarvis progressed to the Deutsche Tourenwagen Masters, racing for Team Phoenix in an Audi A4 DTM 2007. Having finished in the points twice, the Briton ended up 13th in the standings.

The following year, Team Phoenix retained Jarvis in the DTM, where he would partner Alexandre Prémat. A much improved campaign followed, where two podiums, including second at Zandvoort, where he scored his first pole position in the category, elevated Jarvis to ninth overall.

Switching to Abt Sportsline for the 2010 season, five results inside the top six meant that Jarvis would finish ninth in the standings once again.

In 2011, the Brit remained in the DTM at Abt Sportsline. Despite taking a podium finish at Spielberg, Jarvis ended the season sitting tenth in the championship.

He would not be retained by Audi for the 2012 DTM season.

Sportscar career 
During the Pokka 1000km in Suzuka, Jarvis won the race partnering with Juichi Wakisaka and André Lotterer despite not having to drive throughout the race.

Javis would transition to the FIA GT1 World Championship in 2012, driving alongside Frank Stippler for Team WRT. With five podiums across the season, the pairing finished eighth overall. He also competed in that year's 24 Hours of Le Mans for Audi.

In 2013, Jarvis raced for Alex Job Racing with an Audi R8 Grand-Am in the 24 Hours of Daytona. He won the class. He also won the 2013 12 Hours of Sebring and came third at the 2013 24 Hours of Le Mans in an Audi R18 e-tron quattro.

When Audi pulled out of WEC, he signed a contract to race in the Blancpain GT Series Endurance Cup for Bentley during 2017. He also raced in the WEC under Jackie Chan DC Racing in LMP2. This led to him getting a class victory at Le Mans 24 Hours and second overall. They went on to score second in the championship standings. 

For 2018, he will be racing in the IMSA GT Championship for Mazda Team Joest.

Jarvis teamed up with Tom Blomqvist at Meyer Shank Racing w/ Curb-Agajanian in the IMSA SportsCar Championship for the 2022 season. The pair would end up winning the title, having taken a pair of victories, including one at the 24 Hours of Daytona.

Racing record

Racing career summary 

† As Jarvis was a guest driver, he was ineligible for points.

‡ Teams' standings

Complete A1 Grand Prix results 
(key) (Races in bold indicate pole position) (Races in italics indicate fastest lap)

Complete Super GT results
(key) (Races in bold indicate pole position) (Races in italics indicate fastest lap)

Complete Deutsche Tourenwagen Masters results
(key) (Races in bold indicate pole position) (Races in italics indicate fastest lap)

† — Retired, but was classified as he completed 90 per cent of the winner's race distance.

Complete 24 Hours of Le Mans results

Complete GT1 World Championship results

Complete FIA World Endurance Championship results

Complete IMSA SportsCar Championship results

References

External links
Official website
Gallery of Oliver's first A1GP Team GBR Official Test, at Silverstone

1984 births
Living people
People from Burwell, Cambridgeshire
English racing drivers
A1 Team Great Britain drivers
British Formula Three Championship drivers
Japanese Formula 3 Championship drivers
Dutch Formula Renault 2.0 drivers
British Formula Renault 2.0 drivers
Formula Ford drivers
Deutsche Tourenwagen Masters drivers
Karting World Championship drivers
World Series Formula V8 3.5 drivers
FIA GT1 World Championship drivers
24 Hours of Le Mans drivers
24 Hours of Daytona drivers
Rolex Sports Car Series drivers
American Le Mans Series drivers
FIA World Endurance Championship drivers
Blancpain Endurance Series drivers
Super GT drivers
WeatherTech SportsCar Championship drivers
24 Hours of Spa drivers
Asian Le Mans Series drivers
Porsche Carrera Cup GB drivers
12 Hours of Sebring drivers
24H Series drivers
Carlin racing drivers
Manor Motorsport drivers
A1 Grand Prix drivers
Motaworld Racing drivers
Meyer Shank Racing drivers
Team Joest drivers
Audi Sport drivers
United Autosports drivers
W Racing Team drivers
G-Drive Racing drivers
Kolles Racing drivers
Phoenix Racing drivers
Abt Sportsline drivers
TOM'S drivers
Multimatic Motorsports drivers
Nismo drivers
KCMG drivers
Victory Engineering drivers
Comtec Racing drivers
Jota Sport drivers
People educated at King's Ely
M-Sport drivers
Stock Car Brasil drivers